Drab is a dull, light-brown color. It originally took its name from a fabric of the same color made of undyed, homespun wool. The word was first used in English in 1686. It probably originated from the Old French word drap, which meant cloth.

The normalized color coordinates for drab are identical to sand dune, mode beige and bistre brown, which were first recorded as color names in English, respectively, in 1925, 1928, and 1930.

The word gradually came to mean dull, lifeless, or monotonous.

Drab (cloth) 
Drab was a term used for cloths with specific colors such as dull browns, yellowish or gray. The Drab of heavy woolen was produced in Yorkshire, England. It was a thick, sturdy structure used for overcoating.

In military uniforms
Several shades of drab have been used for military uniforms, including the above-mentioned light-brown color. The greenish shades of drab, known as olive drab, were used as the colors of the U.S. Army uniforms and equipment during World War II.

References

External links

Shades of brown
Woven fabrics